This List of Canadian Pro Rodeo Hall of Fame Inductees was created by the Canadian Professional Rodeo Association (CPRA) for the Canadian Pro Rodeo Hall of Fame to recognize extraordinary athletes, both human and animal, in the sport of rodeo. It was founded in 1979 to honor and distinguish these individuals as well as the builders in the Canadian rodeo arena. The Canadian Rodeo Historical Association qualifies the inductees. The Canadian Pro Rodeo Hall of Fame is located at the Calnash Trucking Ag Event Centre in Ponoka, Alberta. Many artifacts from the varied history of rodeo are on display there.

Inductees

*Deceased

*Deceased

See also
 Lists of rodeo performers
 Bull Riding Hall of Fame
 Professional Bull Riders
 Professional Rodeo Cowboys Association
 ProRodeo Hall of Fame
 American Bucking Bull
 International Professional Rodeo Association
 Championship Bull Riding

References

Sources

External links
 Official Site

Sports hall of fame inductees
Canadian ProRodeo
Lists of sports awards
Champions
Rodeo in Canada
Sports halls of fame
Halls of fame in Canada